Prince Leon Mazeppa von Razumovsky (later Jacob Makohin) born September 27, 1880, was a Russian nobleman and a pretender to the Hetmanship of the Ukraine. He claimed to be the sole surviving descendant of Count Kirill Grigorievich Razumovsky who was the last hetman of the Ukraine.

When he was 27 years old, Prince Razumovsky escaped to the United States via Canada following an assassination attempt on his life in the Russian Empire in 1907, during which both of his parents were bayoneted through the heart. He took the name "Jacob Makohin" in honor of the man who died saving his life in the assassination attempt. Under the name Makohin he enlisted in the United States Marine Corps and served during World War I as a pilot. He was promoted to Second Lieutenant June 1, 1919, and retired after being injured.

He married Susan F. Fallon (1891–1976) of Massachusetts. Together, they lived in Austria and then Alassio, Italy during the 1930s and early 40s. During World War II that they were forced to flee back to the United States where they settled in Newton, Massachusetts. They had no children.

Prince Razumovksy died on January 13, 1956, and was buried in Arlington National Cemetery. He is believed to be the only member of European royalty buried in the cemetery. His wife Susan was buried with him after her death in 1976.

References

 Prince Leon Bogun Mazappa Razumowski, ArlingtonCemetery.net, an unofficial website 

1880 births
1956 deaths
Burials at Arlington National Cemetery
United States Marine Corps officers
Princes from the Russian Empire
Monarchists from the Russian Empire
White Russian emigrants to the United States